For many paramagnetic materials, the magnetization of the material is directly proportional to an applied magnetic field, for sufficiently high temperatures and small fields. However, if the material is heated, this proportionality is reduced. For a fixed value of the field, the magnetic susceptibility is inversely proportional to temperature, that is 
 
where
  is the (volume) magnetic susceptibility,
  is the magnitude of the resulting magnetization (A/m),
  is the magnitude of the applied magnetic field (A/m),
  is absolute temperature (K),
  is a material-specific Curie constant (K).

Pierre Curie discovered this relation, now known as Curie's law, by fitting data from experiment. It only holds for high temperatures and weak magnetic fields. As the derivations below show, the magnetization saturates in the opposite limit of low temperatures and strong fields. If the Curie constant is null, other magnetic effects dominate, like Langevin diamagnetism or Van Vleck paramagnetism.

Derivation with quantum mechanics 

A simple model of a paramagnet concentrates on the particles which compose it which do not interact with each other. The energy of a magnetic moment in a magnetic field is given by

 

where  is the magnetic field density, measured in teslas (T).

Two-state (spin-½) particles 
To simplify the calculation, we are going to work with a 2-state particle: it may either align its magnetic moment with the magnetic field or against it. If so, then such a particle has only two possible energies,  when it is aligned with the field and  when it is oriented opposite to the field.

The extent to which the magnetic moments are aligned with the field can be calculated from the partition function. For a single particle, this is
 
The partition function for a set of N such particles, if they do not interact with each other, is
 
and the free energy is therefore 
 
The magnetization is the negative derivative of the free energy with respect to the applied field, and so the magnetization per unit volume is
 
where n is the number density of magnetic moments. The formula above is known as the Langevin paramagnetic equation.
Pierre Curie found an approximation to this law that applies to the relatively high temperatures and low magnetic fields used in his experiments. As temperature increases and magnetic field decreases, the argument of the hyperbolic tangent decreases. In the Curie regime,
 
Moreover, if , then
 
so the magnetization is small, and we can write , and thus

 

In this regime, the magnetic susceptibility given by

 

yields
 

Since this calculation doesn't describe the electrons embedded deep within the Fermi surface, forbidden by the Pauli exclusion principle to flip their spins, it does not exemplify the quantum statistics of the problem at low temperatures. Using the Fermi–Dirac distribution, one will find that at low temperatures  is linearly dependent on the magnetic field, so that the magnetic susceptibility saturates to a constant.

General case 

When the particles have an arbitrary spin (any number of spin states), the formula is a bit more complicated.
At low magnetic fields or high temperature, the spin follows Curie's law, with
 
For a two-level system with magnetic moment , the formula reduces to

as above, while the corresponding expressions in Gaussian units are

For this more general formula and its derivation (including high field, low temperature) see the article Brillouin function.
As the spin approaches infinity, the formula for the magnetization approaches the classical value derived in the following section.

Derivation with classical statistical mechanics 

An alternative treatment applies when the paramagnetons are imagined to be classical, freely-rotating magnetic moments. In this case, their position will be determined by their angles in spherical coordinates, and the energy for one of them will be:

where  is the angle between the magnetic moment and
the magnetic field (which we take to be pointing in the 
coordinate.) The corresponding partition function is

We see there is no dependence on the  angle, and also we can

Now, the expected value of the  component of the magnetization (the other two are seen to be null (due to integration over ), as they should) will be given by

To simplify the calculation, we see this can be written as a differentiation of :

(This approach can also be used for the model above, but the calculation was so simple this
is not so helpful.)

Carrying out the derivation we find

where  is the Langevin function:

This function would appear to be singular for small , but it is not, 
since the two singular terms cancel each other. In fact, its behavior for small arguments is
, so the Curie limit also applies, but with a Curie constant
three times smaller in this case.

History
Pierre Curie observed in 1895 that the magnetic susceptibility of oxygen is inversely proportional to temperature. Paul Langevin presented a classical derivation of this relationship ten years later.

See also
 Curie–Weiss law

References

External links
Curie's law at Merriam-Webster

Electric and magnetic fields in matter
Pierre Curie